NW (formerly New Weekly) was a weekly magazine (typically 110 pages) published in Australia by Bauer Media. It contained articles about media celebrities, Hollywood gossip, clothing, makeup, dieting, and entertainment. In July 2020, the magazine was included in the sale of Bauer Media Australia to Mercury Capital, which closed NW down due to the economic effects of the COVID-19 pandemic.

History and profile
The magazine was started in 1993 under the title New Weekly by then Australian Consolidated Press executive Richard Walsh, with a renaming to NW in 1998. The magazine was headquartered in Sydney. The publisher was Bauer Media Pty Ltd. Circulation was around 200,000.

NW won the Australian Magazine of the Year Award in 2006.

In mid-July 2020, NW was acquired by Mercury Capital, which purchased several of Bauer Media's former Australian and New Zealand brands. Shortly later, Mercury Capital liquidated NW, citing the effects of the COVID-19 pandemic on its publications' advertising revenue.

References

External links
 Official website

1993 establishments in Australia
2020 disestablishments in Australia
ACP magazine titles
Weekly magazines published in Australia
Women's magazines published in Australia
Celebrity magazines
Magazines established in 1993
Magazines disestablished in 2020
Magazines published in Sydney
Mercury Capital